Olvir may refer to:

Olvir Hnufa - a 9th and 10th century Norwegian hersir and skald.
Olvir Rosta - a character from the Orkneyinga saga.